Daisy Waterstone (born 13 June 1994) is a British actress, best known for playing Margo Durrell in the ITV family drama The Durrells.

Early life
Waterstone was born on 13 June 1994 in Hammersmith, London, the daughter of film director and producer Rosie Alison and bookshop chain founder Sir Tim Waterstone. She attended Francis Holland School, Sloane Square.

Waterstone became a member of the National Youth Theatre when she was thirteen, and later took a one-year foundation course at the Cambridge School of Visual and Performing Arts before moving on to her acting career.

Career
Waterstone started her professional career on stage at The Pleasance Theatre, Islington, as Lucy/Nibs in the original production of Peter Pan Goes Wrong, followed by playing Susanna Walcott at The Old Vic in Yaël Farber's production of The Crucible, and has also played Emma in Rules for Living at the Royal National Theatre.
In 2014 she appeared as Katie Bowman in two episodes of the TV series Silent Witness, as Beatrice in the TV miniseries And Then There Were None, and as Clare Leighton in Testament of Youth. In 2015 she had parts in Cyberbully  and Dark Was the Night. From 2015 to 2019, Waterstone played the role of Margo Durrell, a main character in the family comedy drama series The Durrells which ran for four series finishing in May 2019.

Filmography

Film

Television

Theatre

References

External links
 
 
 
The Durrells in Corfu: A Day in the Life of Daisy Waterstone

Living people
1994 births
21st-century English actresses
English film actresses
English television actresses
People educated at Francis Holland School
National Youth Theatre members